Prisăcani is a commune in Iași County, Western Moldavia, Romania. It is composed of three villages: Măcărești, Moreni and Prisăcani.

See also
 Mariana Codruț

References

Communes in Iași County
Localities in Western Moldavia
Populated places on the Prut